Batušinac  is a village in Serbia in the municipality Merošina in Nisava district. According to the 2002 census, the population was 830 (according to the census of 1991, there were 840 inhabitants).

Demographics
In the village Batušinac live 667 adult inhabitants, and the average age is 41.7 years (42.3 for men and 41.1 for women). The village has 202 households, and the average number of people per household is 4.11.
This village is largely populated by Serbs (according to the census of 2002).

References

Populated places in Nišava District